Stenoptilia millieridactyla, also known as the saxifrage plume is a moth of the family Pterophoridae first described by Charles Théophile Bruand d'Uzelle in 1859. It is found in Europe.

Description
The wingspan is 17–20 mm. Adults are on wing in June and July, with a small second generation in late August and early September in some years.

From late August the larvae feed on Saxifraga ragosoi, meadow saxifrage (Saxifraga granulata) and mossy saxifrage (Saxifraga hypnoides) including cultivars. They mine a number of leaves from the base upwards and hibernate in a hibernaculum in the heart of the plant. In spring, larvae feed externally on the plant and pupation takes place outside of the mine.

Distribution
Stenoptilia millieridactyla is found in France, Great Britain, the Iberian Peninsula, Ireland and Italy. Accidentally introduced to Great Britain in the 1960s and expanding its range. In Derbyshire the larvae have been found feeding on cultivars of mossy saxifrage in gardens.

References

millieridactyla
Leaf miners
Moths described in 1859
Plume moths of Europe
Taxa named by Charles Théophile Bruand d'Uzelle